Alexander Sergeyevich Serov (born 12 November 1982, in Vyborg) is a Russian former road and track racing cyclist, who rode professionally between 2001 and 2017 for the Itera, Lokomotiv,  and  teams.

Career achievements

Major results

 2002
 2002 Track Cycling World Cup
 1st, Team Pursuit, Moscow (with Alexei Markov, Sergei Klimov and Denis Smyslov)
 2003
 2003 Track Cycling World Cup
 1st, Team Pursuit, Moscow (with Alexei Markov, Nikita Eskov and Sergei Klimov)
 2005
 2004–2005 Track Cycling World Cup
 3rd, Team Pursuit, Moscow (with Serguei Klimov, Anton Mindlin and Nikolay Trusov)
 2005–2006 Track Cycling World Cup
 3rd, Individual Pursuit, Moscow
 2nd, Team Pursuit, Moscow (with Serguei Klimov, Anton Mindlin and Nikolay Trusov)
 2006
 2005–2006 Track Cycling World Cup
 1st, Team Pursuit, Los Angeles (with Sergei Klimov, Ivan Rovny and Nikolai Trussov)
 2006–2007 Track Cycling World Cup
 1st, Individual Pursuit, Sydney
 1st, Team Pursuit, Sydney (with Mikhail Ignatiev, Ivan Rovny and Nikolai Trussov)
 2nd, Team Pursuit, Moscow (with Ivan Kovalev, Nikolay Trusov and Ivan Rovny)
 1st, Paris–Mantes-en-Yvelines
 2007
 2006–2007 Track Cycling World Cup
 2nd, Individual Pursuit, Manchester
 2nd, Eindhoven Team Time Trial (Tinkoff Credit Systems, with Sergei Klimov, Ivan Rovny, Mikhail Ignatiev, Yevgeni Petrov, Pavel Brutt, Vasil Kiryienka and Nikolay Trusov)
 1st, Stage 5, Tour of Britain, Kendal
 2007–2008 Track Cycling World Cup
 3rd, Individual Pursuit, Sydney
 3rd, Individual Pursuit, Beijing
2012
1st, Stage 2, Vuelta a Murcia
2013
1st, Stage 1, Volta a Portugal
1st, Stage 5, Vuelta Ciclista a Costa Rica
2nd European Track Championships – team pursuit (with Artur Ershov, Ivan Kovalev and Evgeny Kovalev)
2014
8th, Grand Prix of Moscow

Grand Tour general classification results timeline

References

External links 
 

Russian male cyclists
Russian track cyclists
1982 births
Living people
Cyclists at the 2008 Summer Olympics
Cyclists at the 2012 Summer Olympics
Olympic cyclists of Russia
Sportspeople from Vyborg